Botezat or Botezatu is a Romanian surname. Notable people with the surname include:

Eugen Botezat
Cătălin Botezatu, Romanian model and fashion designer
Ionuț Botezatu, Romanian rugby union player
Gheorghe Botezatu

Romanian-language surnames